Harry Barkus Gray (born November 14, 1935) is the Arnold O. Beckman Professor of Chemistry at California Institute of Technology.

Career
Gray received his B.S. in chemistry from Western Kentucky University in 1957. He began his work in inorganic chemistry at Northwestern University, where he earned his Ph.D. in 1960 working under Fred Basolo and Ralph Pearson. He was initiated into the Upsilon chapter of Alpha Chi Sigma at Northwestern University in 1958. After that, he spent a year (1960–61) as an NSF Postdoctoral Fellow at the University of Copenhagen, where, along with Walter A. Manch, he collaborated with Carl J. Ballhausen on studies of the electronic structures of metal complexes.

After completing his NSF Postdoctoral Fellow at the University of Copenhagen, he relocated to New York City to take up a faculty appointment at Columbia University. He served as an assistant professor from 1961 to 1963 and as an associate professor from 1963 to 1965.

In 1966, he became the Arnold O. Beckman Professor of Chemistry at California Institute of Technology, and founding director of the Beckman Institute for Advanced Science and Technology. He also served on the Physical Sciences jury for the Infosys Prize from 2010 to 2013.

Research
Gray's interdisciplinary research program addresses a wide range of fundamental problems in inorganic chemistry, biochemistry, and biophysics. Electron transfer (ET) chemistry is a unifying theme for much of this research.

Over the past twenty-five years the Gray group has been measuring the kinetics of long-range ET reactions in metalloproteins labeled with inorganic redox reagents. Early research by his lab members showed that details of the internal structures of the proteins dominate the ET rates.  Current research is aimed at understanding how intermediate protein radicals accelerate long-range ET. In collaboration with Jay R. Winkler of the Beckman Institute at Caltech they have developed new techniques for measuring ET rates in crystals of Ru-, Os-, and Re-modified azurins, as well as crystals of Fe(III)-cytochrome c doped with Zn(II)-cytochrome c. This method of integrating photosensitizers into protein crystals has provided a powerful new tool for studying biochemical reaction dynamics. The Gray/Winkler group is also using ET chemistry to probe the dynamics of protein folding in cytochrome c.

Major publications

Awards and honors
His accolades include:

1970 ACS Award in Pure Chemistry
1979 Tolman Award
1986 National Medal of Science
1990 AIC Gold Medal
1992 Priestley Medal
2000 Harvey Prize
2000 Foreign Member of the Royal Society
2004 The Benjamin Franklin Medal in Chemistry
2004 Wolf Prize in Chemistry
2009 Welch Award
2012 Inducted into the Alpha Chi Sigma Hall of Fame
2013 Othmer Gold Medal for outstanding contribution to chemistry and science.

Wolf Prize
He was awarded the Wolf Prize in Chemistry in 2004 for his pioneering work in bioinorganic chemistry, unraveling novel principles of structure and long-range electron transfer in proteins.

Gray has made generative contributions to the understanding of chemical bonding of metal complexes, mechanisms of inorganic reactions, spectroscopy and magneto-chemistry of inorganic compounds. His study of the first trigonal prismatic complexes is one such example. Harry Gray's most significant work lies at the interface between chemistry and biology. As a pioneer of the important and thriving field of bioinorganic chemistry, he has made many key contributions, the most important of which is the development of fundamental understanding of electron transfer in biological systems, at the atomic level.

References

1935 births
Living people
People from Woodburn, Kentucky
21st-century American chemists
Inorganic chemists
Foreign Members of the Royal Society
Northwestern University alumni
Columbia University faculty
California Institute of Technology faculty
Wolf Prize in Chemistry laureates
National Medal of Science laureates
Western Kentucky University alumni
Members of the United States National Academy of Sciences